Murray D. Lincoln Campus Center is a high-rise building on the University of Massachusetts Amherst campus, in Amherst, Massachusetts.

Building
The concrete building and attached parking garage were designed by Marcel Breuer, in the Modernist and Brutalist architectural styles.

The building also hosts The Campus Center Hotel on the upper floors of the building. The hotel consists of 116 rooms.  Between 2008 and 2009, the hotel was renovated by Eastern General Contractors of Springfield, MA under the direction of Architectural firm Gensler.

Murray D. Lincoln
The Center is named after Murray D. Lincoln, a leader in the cooperative movement, a founder of what became Nationwide Insurance, and co-founder and first president of CARE.

References

External links
UMassAmherst Physical Plant: Murray D. Lincoln Campus Center
Emporis: Murray D. Lincoln Campus Center

University of Massachusetts Amherst buildings
Hotels in Massachusetts
Skyscrapers in Massachusetts
Buildings and structures completed in 1970
Marcel Breuer buildings
Brutalist architecture in Massachusetts
Modernist architecture in Massachusetts